Dharmatma (The Holy Soul) is a 1935 Hindi social devotional biopic directed by V. Shantaram. The film was a bilingual made in Marathi and Hindi. This was the only devotional film directed by Shantaram, though he had made several mythological films. The story and screenplay were by K. Narayan Kale and the music was composed by Master Krishnarao. The cast included Bal Gandharva in his debut role and Chandra Mohan as the villain, with Master Chhotu, K. Narayan Kale, Ratnaprabha, Vasanti and Hari Pandit.

The film is about the "legendary" Marathi religious poet and scholar Sant Eknath (1533–99), author of a variation of the Bhagavata Purana called Eknathi Bhagvata, numerous abhangs and the bharuda form of solo performances.
The story revolves around his teachings regarding social injustices concerning untouchability, equality and humanity.

Plot
Eknath (Bal Gandharva) concentrates on giving charitable and caring help to people especially those of the untouchable caste. This goes in variance against the vindictive Mahant (Chandra Mohan) who opposes such practices. Things come to a head when at a prayer meeting, Eknath feeds the untouchables first, before the Brahmins, as would be the normal custom. Eknath does not differentiate between castes and eats at their house too. This enrages the Mahant and he has Eknath ex-communicated. Eknath's son Hari Pandit (Kale) has joined the people and the Mahant who oppose his father's practices. Eknath finally arrives at Kashi and defends his behaviour by reciting verses of his poems to Pradayananda Shastri.

Cast
 Bal Gandharva as Sant Eknath
 Chandra Mohan as Mahant
 Ratnaprabha
 Keshav Narayan Kale as Hari Pandit
 Master Chhotu as Shrikhandya
 Vasanti
 Kelkar
 Vasant Desai
 Budasaheb
 Rajni

Production
Sant Eknath was the "only male role" enacted by Bal Ghandharva, who was a Marathi stage "legend". The film had a bigger budget allocated to it than Prabhat's Sant Tukaram (1936) made the following year. The original title Mahatma had to be changed due to the censors objection. Chandra Mohan's character was given a "nervous tic in one eye" to make him appear as an ordinary villain, and for expressionistic purposes Shantaram made use of "high-angle close-ups". Dharmatma was one of the only four films made on caste system around that period. The others were Chandidas (1932), Chandidas (1934), and to a lesser extent Achhut Kanya (1936) which had a "contemporary setting".

Soundtrack
The music direction was by Master Krishnarao Phulambrikar, a classical musician who combined with another classicist Bal Gandharva in the film to create "a milestone in Indian cinema". The lyrics were by Narottam Vyas. There were sixteen songs in the film and the singers were Bal Gandharva, Vasant Desai, Ratnaprabha, Vasanti and Master Chhotu.

Songs

References

External links

1935 films
1930s Hindi-language films
Prabhat Film Company films
Films directed by V. Shantaram
1930s Marathi-language films
Articles containing video clips
Indian black-and-white films
Indian biographical films
1930s biographical films